Ehmedê Xasî (born in 1866/67 in Lice – died 18 February 1951) was a Kurdish literary figure and Mufti. He is best known for his work Mewlîdu'n-Nebîyyî'l-Qureyşîyyî from 1899 which is considered the first literary work in Zaza.

Biography 
Xasî was born in the 1866 or 1867 in the village of Hêzan (Xas) near Lice which was part of the Ottoman Empire. He was from the Xas tribe and his family stemmed from Bingöl. He received his education in a madrasa taught under a Molla Hasan and later moved to Diyarbakır where he was taught by Molla Mustafa Hatib and later Mufti İbrahim Efendi at the Great Mosque of Diyarbakır. From around 1911, he served in different administrative positions; first as the Müderris of Diyarbakir and thereafter transferred to his home village where he remained as a Müderris. After staying there for a while, he was appointed Mufti of Lice, a position he remained at for two years. By the time he resigned as Mufti, his influence spread from Bingöl to Siverek.

He was a staunch opponent of the Committee of Union and Progress and was exiled to Rhodes in March 1909. He would be released by Mehmed V. During this period, Xasî had many arguments with Turkish nationalist Ziya Gökalp.

Xasî spoke Zaza, Kurmanji Kurdish, Turkish, Arabic and Persian. Most of his works were burned by his grandson after the 1971 Turkish military memorandum.

Mewlid 
Xasî wrote his main work Mewlîdu'n-Nebîyyî'l-Qureyşîyyî in 1899 and about 400 copies were printed in 1900. The mawlid had 14 chapters and 366 couplets.

Notes

Bibliography 

 
 
 
 

1860s births
1951 deaths
Year of birth uncertain
Kurdish poets
People from Diyarbakır Province
19th-century Kurdish people
20th-century Kurdish people
Kurdish people from the Ottoman Empire
Zaza language